Emil Arnold (1897–1974) was a Swiss politician. He was an active participant in the 1918 bank sector strike and the 1918 Swiss general strike. He was a member of the Communist International executive as of 1921. He became a member of the Grand Council of Basel-Stadt in 1926. He was a member of the National Council in 1932. He was a founding member of the Swiss Party of Labour in 1944. In 1951 he again served as a member of the National Council.

References

1897 births
1974 deaths
Swiss Party of Labour politicians
Members of the National Council (Switzerland)